Guilaine Londez (born 1 January 1965) is a French film actress. She has appeared in more than sixty films since 1991.

Filmography

Theater

References

External links
 

1965 births
Living people
French film actresses
French television actresses
French stage actresses
20th-century French actresses
21st-century French actresses
People from Saint-Gilles, Gard